BTQ can refer to any of the following:

BTQ-7, the Seven Network owned-and-operated television station in Brisbane, Australia
Banque de terminologie du Québec, a Quebec-based terminological database now part of Grand dictionnaire terminologique
2-Butyl-3-(p-tolyl)quinuclidine, a stimulant drug
 The logical fallacy of Begging The Question